François Bracci (born 31 October 1951 in Beinheim) is a French football manager and former player. He obtained a total number of 18 international caps for the France national team. Playing for Olympique de Marseille (1971–1979), he was a member of the French squad that competed at the 1978 FIFA World Cup.

References

External links
 
 
 
 

1951 births
Living people
Sportspeople from Bas-Rhin
French footballers
Association football defenders
France international footballers
1978 FIFA World Cup players
Ligue 1 players
Ligue 2 players
Olympique de Marseille players
RC Strasbourg Alsace players
FC Girondins de Bordeaux players
FC Rouen players
AS Béziers Hérault (football) players
French football managers
FC Rouen managers
La Roche VF managers
SC Toulon managers
ÉFC Fréjus Saint-Raphaël managers
CS Constantine managers
MC Alger managers
Olympique Club de Khouribga managers
Fath Union Sport managers
Difaâ Hassani El Jadidi managers
Club Africain football managers
RC Relizane managers
GC Mascara managers
DRB Tadjenanet managers
Debout la France politicians
21st-century French politicians
Expatriate football managers in Algeria
French expatriate sportspeople in Algeria
Footballers from Alsace